Étoile sportive de Béni-Khalled is a Tunisian football club, based in the city of Béni Khalled in northeast Tunisia, on the south coast near to the Cap Bon peninsula.

Managers

Abderrazak Aloui (1964–67)
Driss Aloui (1967–68)
Hammadi Jaouahdou (1976–77)
Kilani Derouiche (1977–78)
Rejeb Sayeh (1979–81)
Mohamed Mensi and Mohamed Gritli (1981–82)
Mohamed Mensi (1982–83)
Ahmed Aleya and Mustapha Derouiche (1983–84)
Kilani Derouiche (1984–85)
Kilani Derouiche and Mustapha Derouiche (1985–86)
Amor Amri, Mustapha Derouiche then Rejeb Sayeh (1986–87)
Rejeb Sayeh (1987–89)
Salem Kraïem then Mustapha Derouiche (1989–90)
Ali Rached (1990–91)
Mustapha Derouiche (1991–92)

Ali Kaabi, Mustapha Derouiche then Ali Sraïeb (1992–93)
Mahmoud Bacha (1993–94)
Kilani Derouiche (1994–95)
Ali Kaabi then Mahmoud Bacha (1995–96)
Wahid Hidoussi and Abderrahmane Rahmouni (1996–97)
Ali Kaabi then Moncef Arfaoui (1997–98)
Moncef Arfaoui, Ali Kaabi, Mokhtar Tlili, Mustapha Derouiche then Moncef Arfaoui (1998–99)
Mahmoud Bacha and Noureddine Laabidi (1999–00)
Ali Sraïeb and Belghith and Ali Kaabi (2000–01)
Ali Kaabi then Farid Ben Belgacem (2001–02)
Khaled Ben Sassi (2002–03)
Khaled Ben Sassi and Kamel Chebli and Mahmoud Bacha and Khaled Ben Sassi (2003–04)
Khaled Ben Sassi and Habib Mejri (2004–05)

Mahmoud Ouertani and Chedly Mlik and Mahmoud Bacha (2005–06)
Chaker Meftah and Fayçal Mekki and Lassaad Habib (2006–07)
Kilani Derouiche and Fayçal Mekki and Lassaad Habib then Ezzeddine Khémila (2007–08)
Wajdi Essid and Salem Tabbassi and Mejdi Kordi (2008–09)
Ali Ben Néji, Ezzedine Khémila then Kais Yâakoubi (2009–10)
Lotfi Kadri (2010–11)
Sofiène Hidoussi (2011–)

References

External links
 Official site

Beni-Khalled
1946 establishments in Tunisia
Beni-Khalled
Beni-Khalled